Arma, ARMA or variants, may refer to:

Places
 Arma, Kansas, United States
 Arma, Nepal
 Arma District, Peru
 Arma District, Yemen
 Arma Mountains, Afghanistan

People
 Arma people, an ethnic group of the middle Niger River valley
 Arma language, a possible but unattested extinct language of Colombia
 Paul Arma (1905–1987), Hungarian-French pianist, composer, and ethnomusicologist
 Rachid Arma (born 1985), Moroccan footballer
 Tom Arma, a New York–based photographer 
 Arma Senkrah (1864–1900), an American violinist

Organisations
 ARMA International, formerly the Association of Records Managers and Administrators
 Agung Rai Museum of Art, Ubud, Bali, Indonesia
 American Rock Mechanics Association, a geoscience organization
 Armenian Medical Association or ArMA
 Association for Renaissance Martial Arts, an American non-profit organization
 FK Ústí nad Labem, nicknamed and formerly named Arma, a Czech football club

Other uses
 Arma (deity), an Anatolian Moon god
 Arma (insect), a genus of stink bugs in the subfamily Asopinae
 ARMA (series), a series of computer games
 Otokar Arma, a military armoured vehicle
 Autoregressive–moving-average model, or ARMA model, a statistical model for time series
 16S rRNA (guanine1405-N7)-methyltransferase, or ArmA, an enzyme

See also

Armas (disambiguation)
 Alma (disambiguation)